The University of Information Technology & Sciences commonly known as UITS is a private university in Baridhara, Dhaka, Bangladesh. It is the first IT based private university in Bangladesh.

History
The University of Information Technology and Sciences (UITS), the first IT-based private university in Bangladesh, was founded on August 7, 2003, as a non-profit organization.

Administration
The vice chancellor of the university is the chief executive. Each academic department has its own head. On top of the administration, there is the Board of Trustees (BoT), headed by a chairperson, which oversees policy matters. In the academic sphere, the highest authority is vested in the Academic Council represented by heads of schools and teaching departments, representatives of teachers and nominated members who are associated with education, science, culture, industries, media and scientific and cultural organizations in the country. The council is presided over by the vice chancellor. The registrar of the university acts as the secretary who is also the custodian of the university seal.

List of vice-chancellors 
 Mohammad Solaiman (2017-2022) 
 Md. Abu Hashan Bhuiyan (Acting) (2022-present)

Academic programs

School of Science & Engineering (SSE) 
 Civil Engineering (CE)
 Computer Science & Engineering (CSE)
 Information Technology (IT).
 Electronics & Communication Engineering (ECE).
 Electrical & Electronics Engineering (EEE).
 Bachelor of Pharmacy (B.Pharm.).

School of Business (SoB)
 Bachelor of Business Administration (BBA)
 Master of Business Administration (MBA)
 Executive MBA

School of Liberal Arts & Social Sciences (SLASS)
 Bachelor of Arts in English
 Bachelor of Law (Honors)
 Bachelor of Law (2 years)
 Bachelor of Social Sciences in Social Work
 Master of Arts in English
 Master of Law (1 year)
 Master of Law (2 years)
 Master of Social Sciences in Social Work (1 year)

Permanent campus 

The university has shifted to a fully equipped permanent campus on November 11, 2019, situated at Nayanagar, Vatara, Dhaka. The campus started its journey right after the freshers ceremony of Autumn Semester, 2019.

Timeline of UITS 
 On August 7, 2003, the university began with 3 schools.
 On March 10, 2004, the Bachelor of Business Administration, the first undergraduate program of UITS, was started under Business Studies Department.
 On August 22, 2004, the Bachelor of Arts in English and Master of Computer Applications was started under Department of English and Computer Science & Engineering.
 On October 18, 2004, the International Master of Business Administration was started under Business Studies Department
 On September 13, 2005, the programme Bachelor of Science in Computer Science & Engineering was started under Department of Computer Science & Engineering.
 On October 9, 2005, the programme Bachelor of Science in Electronics & Communication Engineering and the Master of Science in Telecommunications were started under the Department of Electronics & Communication Engineering.
 On November 20, 2005, the programme Bachelor of Laws was started under the Department of Law.
 On March 22, 2006, the programme Master of Laws was started under the Department of Law. Master of Arts in English was started under the Department of English, and Bachelor of Science in Information Technology was started under Department of Information Technology.
 On May 3, 2006, the programme Master of Science in Telecommunication was started under the Department of Electronic & Communication Engineering.
 On July 27, 2008, the programme Bachelor of Laws (2 years) was started under the Department of Law.
 On December 21, 2008, the programme Bachelor of Science in Electrical & Electronic Engineering was started under the Department of Electrical & Electronic Engineering.
 On May 7, 2012, the programme Bachelor of Science in Civil Engineering was started under the Department of Civil Engineering.
 On October 22, 2013, the programme Bachelor of Social Sciences in Social Work and Master of Social Sciences in Social Work was started under the Department of Social Work.
 On December 3, 2013, the programme Bachelor of Pharmacy was started under the Department of Pharmacy.
 In October 2018 the programme Bachelor of Pharmacy was accredited by the Pharmacy Council of Bangladesh (PCB).

References

External links
 Official website

Private universities in Bangladesh
Information
Universities and colleges in Dhaka
2003 establishments in Bangladesh